Helen Dale (born Helen Darville; 1972) is an Australian writer and lawyer. She is best known for writing The Hand that Signed the Paper, a novel about a Ukrainian family who collaborated with the Nazis in The Holocaust, under the pseudonym Helen Demidenko.

A daughter of British immigrants, Darville was educated at Redeemer Lutheran College in Rochedale, a suburb of Brisbane. While studying English literature at the University of Queensland, she wrote The Hand that Signed the Paper. In 1993, the novel won The Australian/Vogel Literary Award for an unpublished manuscript.

Dale published her book in 1994 and won the Miles Franklin Award, becoming the award's youngest winner. The following year, she was the subject of a major Australian literary controversy because she had falsely claimed Ukrainian ancestry as part of the basis of the book (and her pseudonym). The misrepresentation has been described as a "literary hoax" in The Sydney Morning Herald. The novel was subsequently reissued under her legal name, then Helen Darville. It won the 1995 Australian Literary Society Gold Medal.

After teaching, Dale returned to university, gaining her law degree in 2002. She later did post-graduate law study at Oxford and completed an LLB degree in 2012 at the University of Edinburgh. She returned to Australia and became a senior adviser to David Leyonhjelm, a Liberal Democrat member of the Australian Senate, but at the end of May 2016 Leyonhjelm revealed that Dale had left his employ.

Early life
A daughter of British immigrants, Darville was educated at Redeemer Lutheran College in Rochedale, a suburb of Brisbane. She had previously claimed that her father was Ukrainian, and her mother was Irish.

The Hand that Signed the Paper: Novel and controversy
While studying English literature at the University of Queensland, she wrote The Hand that Signed the Paper, a novel about a Ukrainian family who collaborated with the Nazis in The Holocaust. In 1993, the novel won The Australian Vogel Literary Award for an unpublished manuscript.

Contents
The novel tells the story of a Ukrainian family trying to survive a decade of Stalinist purges and state-imposed poverty and famine. The family comprises the parents, a daughter, and two sons. They suffer abuse by the drunken local commissar and are refused treatment by the village doctor and his wife (a secular Jew). Many Ukrainians hail the German invaders as liberators from Soviet oppression. Many volunteered for the German armed forces—Wehrmacht, SS, and Ordnungspolizei. The novel stresses the arbitrariness of the assignments to military units. A Ukrainian could as easily end up fighting on the front alongside the Wehrmacht as be in a death squad.

The two young brothers are separated in military assignments: 16-year-old Evheny to Nazi Einsatzgruppen C (a mobile killing squad) and the elder 19-year-old Vitaly to the SS training facility for Ukrainians at Trawniki in Poland. Evheny is implicated in the massacre at Babi Yar outside Kiev, while Vitaly is posted to Treblinka extermination camp as a guard. Evheny is later sent to a front-line Waffen SS formation on the Eastern Front, while Vitaly is posted to northern Italy. He is part of German anti-partisan activity in the wake of Italy's withdrawal from the Axis alliance.

Style
The novel is told primarily from the point of view of Kateryna, sister of the two brothers, and Magda, Vitaly's common-law wife from the Polish village near the Treblinka extermination camp. Kateryna has a relationship with a German SS Hauptsturmführer. Magda assists a Jewish prisoner to escape after the Treblinka prisoner revolt in August 1943. The family's story is gradually revealed by Fiona, Evheny's Australian-born daughter, who starts investigating the past after her uncle Vitaly is charged in the early 1990s with war crimes in World War II.

The book is frank about the anti-semitism of its major characters (who blame Jews for the excesses of Communism), and Darville represented the lives of Ukrainian military men in a sympathetic manner, rather than featuring their victims as is more usual in Holocaust literature. These elements attracted accusations of anti-semitism and condemnation of the book by leaders of Australia's Jewish community. There was a perception that the attitudes of the author "Helen Demidenko" may have been informed by her Ukrainian ethnic identity, until her pseudonym was revealed along with her false representation of the book as history.

Controversy
The Hand that Signed the Paper won the Miles Franklin Award, one of the most prestigious literary awards in Australia. At the time, the media discovered Helen Dale's identity and legal name. This promoted much debate on the nature of identity, ethnicity, and authenticity in Australian literature.

Despite the adverse publicity for the author, the novel won the 1995 Australian Literary Society Gold Medal.

When Dale submitted her novel to the University of Queensland Press in 1993, she said it was based upon recorded interviews with her own relatives, among others her uncle "Vitaly Demidenko". After the awards, the Sydney Morning Herald mistakenly reported in 2005 that the novel had been submitted as a non-fiction book. The author's 1993 note accompanying her manuscript had read: "The things narrated in this book really happened, the things they did [are] historical actualities." Then Dale wrote that she was presenting her book as fiction, saying: "But this is also a work of fiction. I have presented it as fiction...."

Books that discuss the scandal
The controversy that surrounded The Hand that Signed the Paper inspired the publication in 1996 of two books that assessed the novel and issues of authenticity: Robert Manne's The Culture of Forgetting: Helen Demidenko and the Holocaust and Andrew Riemer's The Demidenko Debate. Manne is very critical of Darville's book. Riemer is not, believing her approach was consistent with fiction, even if she tried to exaggerate the specific historic basis of her work.

Later work and recent years
In 1995, Darville published a short story, "Pieces of the Puzzle", in the Australian culture journal Meanjin. The byline was 'Demidenko', although the journal noted that the author had "taken back" her legal name of Darville. She has said that she had met Ukrainian witnesses to the war and the Holocaust, and based the story on their accounts. The Simon Wiesenthal Center wrote to her demanding that she identify these possible war criminals.

Dale was briefly a columnist with the Brisbane daily newspaper The Courier-Mail. She was dismissed for accusations of plagiarism after repeating jokes originally from the 'Evil Overlord List' in one of her columns and passing them off as her own. She continued to write freelance features for other News Corporation newspapers and magazines, and occasionally the Fairfax press. In 2017, an investigation by BuzzFeed revealed that Dale had also plagiarised a number of social media posts in her Twitter and Facebook feeds. BuzzFeed asked Dale why she had been lifting the tweets. She replied over Twitter direct message: "Cos it's amusing and I don't like Twitter. And don't you have more important stuff to be writing about?"

In 2000, Darville was again accused of anti-semitism after interviewing David Irving, a Holocaust denier, for Australian Style magazine during his libel trial in London. (It was decided against him).  She wrote a post-September 11 article in The Sydney Morning Herald.

After working as a secondary teacher for several years in Australia and the UK, Darville returned to the University of Queensland in 2002 to study law. Graduating with a first class honours degree in law in 2005,she commenced work as a judge's associate for Peter Dutney, a justice of the Supreme Court of Queensland.

Previously a regular contributor to the libertarian group blog Catallaxy files under the name 'skepticlawyer', Darville now has her own blog in this name.

Since gaining her law degree, Darville has also appeared on the SBS program Insight, and as a guest of the University of Melbourne's Publishing and Communications Program. She is associated with the Australian Skeptics, and has written for both their in-house magazine and Quadrant, a conservative journal. In 2007 Darville was reported to be working on a second novel.

Dale completed the Bachelor of Civil Law programme at the University of Oxford, where she was a member of Brasenose College. In 2008 she started reading for an MPhil in Law (Jurisprudence). She completed a Graduate LLB degree at the University of Edinburgh School of Law in 2012. During that time she won the Law Society of Scotland's student essay competition.  The topic of her prize-winning essay was same-sex marriage. Dale completed a post-graduate qualification before beginning work in 2013 as a trainee solicitor with the law firm MBM Commercial.

Darville is reported to have worked variously as a graphic designer, property law lecturer, and physical education teacher.

In 2014, Dale returned to Australia, becoming a senior adviser to David Leyonhjelm, a Liberal Democrat member of the Australian Senate. She resigned during the election campaign in 2016.

Her most recent work is a two-part novel titled Kingdom of the Wicked. The first book, Rules, came out in 2017 and the second, Order, in 2018. It is a reimagining of the trial of Jesus Christ at the hands of Pontius Pilate in a technologically sophisticated Roman Empire.

Further reading
 Jeff Sparrow – "The Return of Helen Demidenko: From Literary Hoaxer to Political Operator" (2015)
 Meyer-Therese-Marie (2006) Where Fiction Ends: Four Scandals of Literary Identity Construction. Wurzburg: Konigshausen & Neumann. . Four case studies of fictional identity creation: Demidenko compared to Ern Malley, B. Wongar, and Frederick Philip Grove (FPB, German-Canadian author).

References

External links
 Audio interview with Helen Darville on ABC Radio National, with transcript
 'My life as a young Australian novelist', May 2006 Quadrant article

1972 births
Living people
Australian women novelists
Miles Franklin Award winners
ALS Gold Medal winners
20th-century Australian novelists
20th-century Australian women writers
University of Queensland alumni
Alumni of Brasenose College, Oxford
Alumni of the University of Edinburgh
Hoaxes in Australia
1994 hoaxes
Impostors
Australian sceptics